Hongdao railway station is a railway station in Chengyang District, Qingdao, Shandong, China. The metro station opened on 24 December 2020 and the high-speed rail station is expected to open in June 2023.

History

China Railway
Both the Jinan–Qingdao high-speed railway and the Qingdao–Yancheng railway opened on 26 December 2018, however Hongdao railway station had not been completed. The high-speed rail station is expected to open in June 2023.

Qingdao Metro
The metro station on Line 8 of the Qingdao Metro on 24 December 2020. Line 10 and 12 of Qingdao Metro, part of Qingdao Metro's long-term plan, will also serve this station.

References
 

Railway stations in Shandong